Greg V. Smith (born November 7, 1968) is an American politician serving as a member of the Oregon House of Representatives from the 57th district.

Education 
Smith graduated from Eastern Oregon University in 1992 with a Bachelor of Liberal Studies. He later earned a Master's Degree in Business Administration.

Political career

Early political involvement
After graduating from college, Smith served as a community advisory member for Senator Gordon Smith. He was also an intern for then-Oregon House of Representatives Majority Leader Greg Walden. In 1996, Smith was an alternate delegate in the 1996 Republican National Convention.

Oregon House of Representatives
In 2000 Smith successfully ran for Oregon State Representative for District 59. In 2001, redistricting moved Smith into House District 57. He ran for re-election and won.

Smith's 2017 committee assignments are as follows:
Joint Ways and Means Committee, Co-Vice Chair
Joint Ways and Means Subcommittee on General Government, Co-Chair
Joint Ways and Means Subcommittee on Capital Construction
Joint Legislative Administration Committee 
Joint Committee on Transportation Preservation & Modernization  
Joint Committee on Tax Reform
Special House Committee on Small Business Growth, Co-Chair
House GOP Caucus Budget Committee, Chair 
Governor Kate Brown's Small Business Cabinet, Member
Cost Containment Workgroup
Provider Assessment Workgroup

Awards and recognitions
During his terms in office, Smith has earned a 100% voting records with the Taxpayer Association of Oregon, Oregon Gun Owners of America, Oregon Farm Bureau, Oregonians for Food and Shelter, and the National Federation of Independent Businesses. The Oregon Cattlemen's Association has given Smith the "Lariat Laureate", their highest award. The Oregon Fair Association has given Smith the title "Grand Champion Legislator" for the work he has done on their behalf. He has also received the "Outstanding Freshman Legislator of the Year" award during the 19th Annual Oregon Rural Health Conference. The NRA has given Smith an A+ grade on his votes regarding gun related legislation. In 2009, Associated Oregon Industries named Smith "A Champion for Oregon Jobs and Business."

Personal life 
He resides in Heppner with his wife Sherri and their five children.

Electoral history

(*)All elections were for Oregon House of Representatives District 57 except for year 2000, which was for Oregon House District 59.

External links 
 Campaign website
 Legislative website
 Vote Smart biography of Smith

References

1968 births
American Latter Day Saints
Eastern Oregon University alumni
Republican Party members of the Oregon House of Representatives
Living people
People from Heppner, Oregon
21st-century American politicians